The Badoglio Proclamation was a speech read on Ente Italiano per le Audizioni Radiofoniche (EIAR) at 19:42 on 8 September 1943 by Marshal Pietro Badoglio, Italian head of government, announcing that the Armistice of Cassibile between Italy and the Allies signed on the 3rd of September had come into force. It followed a speech on Radio Algiers by U.S. General Dwight D. Eisenhower at 18:30 (17:30 Algerian time) also announcing the armistice.

Text

Results

The abandonment of Rome by the military high command, the head of government Badoglio, King Victor Emmanuel III and the king's son, Crown Prince Umberto, their move towards Pescara then Brindisi, and above all the proclamation's use of a format which did not give the clauses of the armistice in a clearly comprehensible form (which was largely wrongly interpreted as meaning a complete end to the war) all led to confusion. This was particularly so among the Italian Armed Forces on all fronts, who remained unaware of the armistice's precise content and disbanded themselves. Over 600,000 Italian soldiers were captured by the German army and sent to various prisoner of war camps under the designation I.M.I. (internati militari italiani, or Italian Military Internees) in the weeks immediately after the announcement. More than half of all Italian soldiers laid down their arms and returned home (as referred to in the title of the 1960 film set at the time, Tutti a casa). The Italian and German high commands intercepted the Eisenhower broadcast first and so the Germans immediately put Operation Achse into effect to disarm their former allies and occupy the whole Italian Peninsula, on 9 September sinking the Italian battleship Roma, which had been ordered on the night of 8 September to sail with the entire Italian fleet to Malta in accordance with the armistice's clauses, under the cover-story of attacking the Allied forces landing at Salerno in Operation Baytown.

At the same time part of the Italian armed forces decided to remain loyal to the king, giving rise to the Italian resistance (one of whose first examples ended in the massacre of the 33rd Infantry Division "Acqui" on Cephalonia by the Germans) and part joined the free individuals, parties and movements such as the Brigata Maiella. Other branches, especially in the north, such as the Xª Flottiglia MAS, decided to remain loyal to fascist Italy and the Germans. Despite the proclamation, the Allies thwarted a massive and immediate release of Italian prisoners of war loyal to the Italian king and the Badoglio regime, to avoid their possibly rejoining the Fascist forces in northern Italy.

References

Bibliography
  Elena Aga-Rossi, Una nazione allo sbando. L'armistizio italiano del settembre 1943 e le sue conseguenze. Bologna, Il Mulino, 2003
  Silvio Bertoldi, Apocalisse italiana. Otto settembre 1943. Fine di una nazione. Milano, Rizzoli, 1998.
  Davide Lajolo, Il voltagabbana. 1963
  Oreste Lizzadri, Il regno di Badoglio. Milano, Edizioni Avanti!, 1963
  Luigi Longo, Un popolo alla macchia. Milano, Mondadori, 1952
  Paolo Monelli, Roma 1943. Torino, Einaudi, 1993
  Ruggero Zangrandi, 1943: 25 luglio–8 settembre. Milano, Feltrinelli, 1964
  Ruggero Zangrandi, Il lungo viaggio attraverso il fascismo. Milano, Feltrinelli, 1976
  Ruggero Zangrandi, L'Italia tradita. 8 settembre 1943. Milano, Mursia, 1995

External links
Text of the announcement by general Dwight D. Eisenhower on Radio Algeri one hour before the Badoglio Proclamation
Message to the Italian nation from Franklin D. Roosevelt
 Rai Teche – audio of the Proclamation (RealMedia format)
 Corriere della Sera – L'autodifesa di Badoglio: «Colpa di Eisenhower»

1943 in Italy
Italian campaign (World War II)
World War II speeches
Proclamations
September 1943 events
1943 documents